St. Joseph is a future light rail station on the T Line of the Link light rail system in Tacoma, Washington, United States. The station is expected to open in 2023 as the terminus of the line. It is located on Martin Luther King Jr. Way at South 18th Street, adjacent to St. Joseph Medical Center.

References

Link light rail stations in Pierce County, Washington
Railway stations scheduled to open in 2023
Buildings and structures in Tacoma, Washington
Transportation in Tacoma, Washington